Bucculatrix lustrella is a moth in the family Bucculatricidae. It was described by Pieter Cornelius Tobias Snellen in 1884. It is found in Russia.

The wingspan is about 8 mm.

References

Natural History Museum Lepidoptera generic names catalog

Bucculatricidae
Moths described in 1884
Moths of Asia